Augerville-la-Rivière is a commune in the Loiret department in north-central France.  It is the site of the Château d'Augerville.

Population

See also
Communes of the Loiret department

References

Communes of Loiret